Thomas E. Murphy is a retired United States Air Force major general who last served as the director of the Protecting Critical Technology Task Force of the Office of the Secretary of Defense. Previously, he was the deputy director for resource integration of the U.S. Air Force.

References

External links

Year of birth missing (living people)
Living people
Place of birth missing (living people)
United States Air Force generals